Indian River Reptile and Dinosaur Park is a small reptile zoo located in Indian River, Ontario, approximately 15 kilometres east of Peterborough, Ontario. The zoo received accreditation in the year 2000 from Canadian Association of Zoos and Aquariums, and remains one of only a few accredited reptile zoos in Canada. It has also been a registered non-profit organization since 2009.

Attractions
The Indian River Reptile and Dinosaur Park is host to more than 200 different reptiles. While some of the reptiles are of species which are native to Canada, there is also large number of species which are native to other parts of the world. The zoo is also known for its popular rattlesnake exhibit, which is also the largest in Canada.

The Indian River Reptile and Dinosaur Park also features more than 50 life size dinosaurs and other prehistoric creatures.
They also feature a mobile dinosaur exhibit for educational or entertainment events.

The outdoor Croc-Walk features hundreds of live Crocodiles

Conservation
Although the zoo offers visitors the opportunity to see a wide range of reptiles, much of its focus is also on the preservation and conservation of all reptile species. This effort includes staffing of highly trained and passionate zoo keepers who help educate the public and spread awareness, as well as various ongoing conservation programs.

See also
List of zoos in Canada
Riverview Park & Zoo

References

External links
Indian River Reptile and Dinosaur Park Official Website

Zoos in Ontario
Culture of Peterborough, Ontario
Buildings and structures in Peterborough, Ontario
Tourist attractions in Peterborough County
Articles needing infobox zoo